Oru Yathrayil is a 2013 Indian Malayalam anthology film. The film comprises four shorts namely Honeymoon, I Love My Appa, Marichavarude Kadal and Amma which all are half an hour long each. The four featurettes are directed by Rajesh Amanakkara, Mathews, Priyanandanan and Major Ravi respectively. Major Ravi coordinated the efforts for the film.

Another featurette titled Sarvashiksha Abhiyan directed by Vinod Vijayan was originally announced but was not included in the final print.

Films

Common Cast
 Anoop Chandran
 Bineesh Kodiyeri
 Rajeev Pillai
 Jayakrishnan
 Pradeep Chandran

Plots
Honeymoon is a take on the life of a newlywed couple in the backdrop of a slum. I Love My Appa is a family drama set in the backdrop of a typical Brahmin colony in Kalpathy in Palakkad. Marichavarude Kadal is about the decline of Gandhian principles in the modern era. It flits between past and present, as the tale of an elderly couple wedded to Gandhism is narrated, in the backdrop of sea. The sea, here is a symbol of the watery end of the great ideals of Mahatma Gandhi. Amma is a tale of an elderly housewife who yearns for love and attention from her husband and grown up children.

References

External links 
 
 Oru Yathrayil at the Malayalam Movie Database
 Review, Nowrunning.com 

2013 films
2010s Malayalam-language films
Indian anthology films